Louis Loren Collins (October 6, 1882 – June 24, 1950) was the 23rd Lieutenant Governor of Minnesota. Born in St. Cloud, Minnesota and became Lieutenant Governor under Governor J. A. O. Preus from January 4, 1921 – January 6, 1925. He died in 1950 in St. Cloud, Minnesota.

External links
Minnesota Historical Society

1882 births
1950 deaths
Lieutenant Governors of Minnesota
Minnesota Republicans
20th-century American politicians